Liina Tõnisson (born 24 May 1940 in Tallinn) is an Estonian politician. She has been a member of VII, VIII, IX, X and XI Riigikogu.

In 1964 she graduated from Tallinn Polytechnical Institute in engineering economics.

From 1995 to 2004, she was a member of Estonian Central Party. From 1995 until 2002 she was the Minister of Economic Affairs in the second government of Tiit Vähi, and from 2002 until 2003, she was the Minister of Economic Affairs and Communications in the government of Siim Kallas.

References

Living people
1940 births
Estonian Centre Party politicians
Women members of the Riigikogu
Members of the Riigikogu, 1992–1995
Members of the Riigikogu, 1995–1999
Members of the Riigikogu, 1999–2003
Members of the Riigikogu, 2003–2007
Members of the Riigikogu, 2007–2011
Politicians from Tallinn
Tallinn University of Technology alumni
21st-century Estonian women politicians